Hoseynabad (also Romanized as Ḩoseynābād and Hosein Abad; also known as Ḩoseynābād-e Baghdādī) is a village in Masumiyeh Rural District, in the Central District of Arak County, Markazi Province, Iran. At the 2006 census, its population was 176, in 47 families.

References 

Populated places in Arak County